Gardone may refer to:

 Gardone Riviera, town and comune in the province of Brescia, in Lombardy, Italy
 Gardone Val Trompia, town and comune in the province of Brescia, in Lombardy, Italy.